The 2014 Supercupa României was the 16th edition of Romania's season opener cup competition. The game was contested between Liga I title holders, Steaua București, and Romanian Cup winners, Astra Giurgiu. It was played at Arena Națională in Bucharest in July. Astra won the trophy for the first time in history, after defeating Steaua Bucharest, the defending champions, 5–3 on penalties.

Match

Details

References

External links
Romania - List of Super Cup Finals, RSSSF.com

2014–15 in Romanian football
Supercupa României
FC Steaua București matches
FC Astra Giurgiu matches
Association football penalty shoot-outs